WUOL-FM (90.5 FM, "Classical 90.5") is a 24-hour listener-supported noncommercial radio station in Louisville, Kentucky, broadcasting a classical music format. It began broadcasting in December 1976 as part of the University of Louisville.

WUOL, along with its sister stations WFPL and WFPK, broadcasts an HD Radio signal. All three stations have been licensed to the Louisville Public Media consortium (formerly Public Radio Partnership) since 1993. Prior to the university donating the station and joining the Partnership, WUOL inadvertently competed against WFPK for classical music listeners in the region.

The station was reassigned the WUOL-FM call letters by the Federal Communications Commission on March 19, 1982.

References

External links
WUOL official website
Louisville Public Media

UOL-FM
Classical music radio stations in the United States
NPR member stations
Radio stations established in 1976
1976 establishments in Kentucky
University of Louisville